The 2011 Gold Coast Titans season was the 5th in the club's history. They competed in the NRL's 2011 Telstra Premiership coached by John Cartwright and captained by Scott Prince. Gold Coast finished the regular season 16th (out of 16), failing to make the finals and collecting the wooden spoon for the first time in the club's history.

Season Summary
The Gold Coast Titans started the season poorly with three first up losses to the reigning premiers St. George Illawarra Dragons, then a 40–12 smashing at the hands of the Melbourne Storm before losing to archrivals the Brisbane Broncos at home. It seemed after the loss to Melbourne that the Titans would never recover and its fans were forecasting a very long season ahead.

Round 4 saw the Titans register their first win for the 2011 season with a 23–22 golden point win over the Canberra Raiders thanks to a Greg Bird field goal in the 2nd minute of extra time. The winning feeling was short-lived with a 10-point loss to the North Queensland Cowboys the following week. Things improved however with the signing of Bulldogs centre Jamal Idris for 5 years and a win against the Wests Tigers in round 6. Round 7 saw the Titans lose their fifth game of the season with the Parramatta Eels scoring a try with 37 seconds remaining to give them a 22–18 victory. A win over the Sydney Roosters in round 8 saw the Titans improve their win–loss record 3–5, and Nathan Friend become the first player to play 100 games for the Titans. This would be the Titans' last win for a while as they lost their next four games, including three at home.

The Titans emerged briefly from their losing streak to beat a depleted St. George Illawarra Dragons missing six players due to Origin before entering a five-game losing streak which included a 36–12 loss to the Cronulla-Sutherland Sharks, which is their worst ever defeat at Skilled Park. To help counter their poor form and last place on the ladder, the Titans lured former dual-international Mat Rogers out of retirement to play out the remainder of the 2011 NRL season. The return did little to change the luck of the Titans with Rogers breaking his foot in his very first game back (although he did achieve a milestone in his comeback, with this being his 200th NRL game) and their poor season continuing with a 22–6 loss against the New Zealand Warriors in round 18. It only got worse for the Titans, with 3 more losses from as many games, including a 30-point thrashing from the Newcastle Knights in round 21.

Round 22 saw the Titans rebound with a gutsy 20–16 win over the Cronulla-Sutherland Sharks but came at a price, with captain Scott Prince breaking his arm and being ruled out for the remainder of the season. The loss of Prince saw retiring club legend Preston Campbell elevated to captain but faced a tough debut against the ladder leading Melbourne Storm. Melbourne easily handled the Titans beating them by 24 points, the game also saw Preston Campbell play his 100th game for the Titans. Round 24 saw the Titans jump two spaces clear of the bottom of the ladder thanks to a 26–18 victory over the Canberra Raiders in front of their lowest ever home crowd of just 10,230.

The Titans had a chance to secure safety from the wooden spoon with a win in Round 25 against the Tigers but instead were soundly beaten by 19 points. Round 26 saw the 15th-placed Titans play the 16th-placed Parramatta Eels in the so-called "Wooden Spoon Showdown", with the loser taking out the wooden spoon for the 2011 season. Despite home ground advantage and wanting to send retiring Preston Campbell out a winner, the Titans gave the Eels a 22-point lead at halftime. The lead proved too much for the Titans, eventually losing 32–12 and collecting the club's first wooden spoon.

Milestones
Round 1: Luke Capewell made his debut for the club, after previously playing for the South Sydney Rabbitohs.
Round 1: Kevin Gordon played his 50th game for the club and his 50th career game.
Round 2: Preston Campbell played his 250th career game.
Round 4: Anthony Laffranchi scored his 50th career try.
Round 5: Matthew White and William Zillman both played their 50th career game for the club.
Round 6: Michael Henderson played his 100th career game.
Round 7: Luke Bailey played his 200th career game.
Round 8: Nathan Friend became the first player to play 100 career games for the club.
Round 12: Matt Srama made his debut for the club and his debut in the NRL.
Round 12: Sam Tagataese played his 50th career game.
Round 14: Mark Minichiello played his 100th career game for the club.
Round 14: Matt Srama scored his 1st career try.
Round 15: Scott Prince played his 250th career game.
Round 16: Brenton Lawrence made his debut for the club and his debut in the NRL.
Round 18: Mat Rogers played his 200th career game.
Round 20: Beau Henry made his debut for the club, after previously played for the Newcastle Knights.
Round 20: Scott Prince played his 100th career game for the club.
Round 21: Anthony Laffranchi played his 200th career game.
Round 21: Dominique Peyroux made his debut for the club and his debut in the NRL.
Round 23: Preston Campbell played his 100th career game for the club.
Round 23: David Mead played his 50th game for the club and his 50th career game.
Round 24: Anthony Laffranchi played his 100th career game for the club.
Round 24: Will Matthews scored his 1st career try.

Awards
Luke Bailey won a record third Paul Broughton Medal for the club's best and fairest player and also won Clubman of the Year. Matt Srama won Titan's Rookie of the Year while Kevin Gordon who missed the majority of the season with a knee injury won the Community Award. David Mead was awarded Try of the Year for his impressive one-handed pickup from a Scott Prince kick in Round 22 against the Cronulla-Sutherland Sharks. Retiring club legend Preston Campbell took home the Members Choice Player of the Year and became the second inductee into the Titan's Hall of Fame.

Squad List

Squad Movement

Gains

Losses

Re-signings

Ladder

Fixtures

Pre-season

Regular season

Statistics

Source:

Representative honours
The following players played a representative match during the 2011 NRL Season.

Indigenous All Stars
Greg Bird
Ryan James
Scott Prince

NSW Blues
Greg Bird

NSW City Origin
Mark Minichiello

NRL All Stars
Ashley Harrison

Queensland Maroons
Ashley Harrison

Prime Minister's XIII
Greg Bird

References

Gold Coast Titans seasons
Gold Coast Titans season